John Burt Longwell (1883 – ?) was an American football player, coach of football and basketball, and dentist.  He served as the head football coach at Howard College—now Samford University—in Birmingham, Alabama during the 1909, 1911, 1916 and 1917 seasons and at New York University (NYU) in 1919, compiling a career college football record of 18–18–3.  Longwell was also the head basketball coach at Howard during the 1916–17 season, tallying a mark of 3–5.

Longwell took over the Howard football program from interim coach W. A. Blount in 1909. His first team went 5–2–1 and outscored opponents 82 to 30 over eight games. James C. Donnelly coached the next season. When Longwell returned the following season, the 1–6–1 1911 Bulldogs only managed six points to their opponents' 158 in an eight-game season. B. L. Noojin coached the next three seasons, succeeded by Eugene Caton in 1915. Longwell returned in 1916 and guided the Bulldogs to a 6–4 record (146 points scored to 92 points against). He coached the first five games of the next season before resigning. C. W. Streit completed the 3–3–1 season. His overall record with the Bulldogs was 14–14–3 in 31 games.  Longwell's Bulldogs averaged 8.74 points per game.

Longwell was a graduate in medicine at the University of Pennsylvania, class of 1909. He later worked as a dentist in New York.

Head coaching record

Football

Notes

References

1883 births
Year of death missing
American dentists
NYU Violets football coaches
Penn Quakers football players
Samford Bulldogs football coaches
Samford Bulldogs men's basketball coaches